Iowa Park Consolidated Independent School District is a public school district based in Iowa Park, Texas (USA).

Located in central Wichita County, the district extends into a small portion of northwestern Archer County. In Wichita County the district includes Iowa Park, most of Pleasant Valley, and a small portion of Wichita Falls. In addition, the district also serves the communities of Kamay and Valley View.

In 2009, the school district was rated "recognized" by the Texas Education Agency.

Schools
Iowa Park High School (Grades 9-12)
W.F. George Middle School (Grades 6-8)
Bradford Elementary School (Grades 3-5)
Kidwell Elementary School (Grades PK-2)

References

External links

School districts in Wichita County, Texas
School districts in Archer County, Texas
Education in Wichita Falls, Texas